The Saint Paul City Hall and Ramsey County Courthouse, located at 15 Kellogg Boulevard West in Saint Paul, Ramsey County, in the U.S. state of Minnesota is a twenty-story Art Deco skyscraper completed in 1932.  Built during the Great Depression era of high unemployment and falling prices, the four million dollar budget for the building was underspent, and the quality of materials and craftsmanship were higher than initially envisioned. The exterior consists of smooth Indiana limestone in the Art Deco style known as "American Perpendicular", designed by Thomas Ellerbe & Company of Saint Paul and Holabird & Root of Chicago and inspired by Finnish architect, Eliel Saarinen. The vertical rows of windows are linked by plain, flat, black spandrels.  Above the Fourth Street entrance and flanking the Kellogg Boulevard entrance are relief sculptures carved by Lee Lawrie.

The interior design in the "Zigzag Moderne" style drew its inspiration from the Exposition Internationale des Arts Décoratifs et Industriels Modernes, which promoted soft ornamentation and sensuous curves.  In Memorial Hall the white marble floor contrasts with three-story black marble piers leading to a gold-leaf ceiling. At the end of the hall is the 60-ton,  white onyx Indian God of Peace by Carl Milles (later renamed Vision of Peace). Other features include woodwork fashioned out of twenty-three different species of wood and uses five different types of imported marble. Murals were painted by John W. Norton while the six bronze elevator doors were made by Albert Stewart.

See also
List of tallest buildings in Saint Paul

References

External links

St. Paul City Hall and Ramsey County Courthouse in MNopedia, the Minnesota Encyclopedia

1932 establishments in Minnesota
Art Deco architecture in Minnesota
Art Deco skyscrapers
City and town halls in Minnesota
City and town halls on the National Register of Historic Places in Minnesota
County courthouses in Minnesota
Courthouses on the National Register of Historic Places in Minnesota
Government buildings completed in 1932
National Register of Historic Places in Saint Paul, Minnesota
Skyscraper office buildings in Saint Paul, Minnesota